In mathematics, a primorial prime is a prime number of the form pn# ± 1, where pn# is the primorial of pn (i.e. the product of the first n primes).

Primality tests show that

 pn# − 1 is prime for n = 2, 3, 5, 6, 13, 24, ... 
 pn# + 1 is prime for n = 0, 1, 2, 3, 4, 5, 11, ... 

The first term of the second sequence is 0 because p0# =  1 is the empty product, and thus p0# + 1 = 2, which is prime. Similarly, the first term of the first sequence is not 1, because p1# = 2, and 2 − 1 = 1 is not prime.

The first few primorial primes are

2, 3, 5, 7, 29, 31, 211, 2309, 2311, 30029, 200560490131, 304250263527209, 23768741896345550770650537601358309 

, the largest known primorial prime (of the form pn# − 1) is 3267113# − 1 (n = 234,725) with 1,418,398 digits, found by the PrimeGrid project.

, the largest known prime of the form pn# + 1 is 392113# + 1 (n = 33,237) with 169,966 digits, found in 2001 by Daniel Heuer.

Euclid's proof of the infinitude of the prime numbers is commonly misinterpreted as defining the primorial primes, in the following manner:

 Assume that the first n consecutive primes including 2 are the only primes that exist. If either pn# + 1 or pn# − 1 is a primorial prime, it means that there are larger primes than the nth prime (if neither is a prime, that also proves the infinitude of primes, but less directly; each of these two numbers has a remainder of either p − 1 or 1 when divided by any of the first n primes, and hence all its prime factors are larger than pn).

See also 
 Compositorial
 Euclid number
 Factorial prime

References

See also 
Comput. 26 (1972): 567–570.
 Chris Caldwell, The Top Twenty: Primorial at The Prime Pages.
 Harvey Dubner, "Factorial and Primorial Primes." J. Rec. Math. 19 (1987): 197–203.
 Paulo Ribenboim, The New Book of Prime Number Records. New York: Springer-Verlag (1989): 4.

Integer sequences
Classes of prime numbers